Rohit Srivastava is a professor in the Department of Biosciences and Bioegineering at IIT Bombay specialising in medical diagnostic devices, nanoengineered materials and photothermal cancer therapy. He was awarded the Shanti Swarup Bhatnagar Prize for Science and Technology in Medical Sciences in the year 2021 for his contributions to the development of affordable medical devices.

Rohit Srivastava heads the NanoBios Lab in the Department of Biosciences and Bioengineering in IIT Bombay. The lab has developed and commercialised several products including UChek which is a mobile based portable urine analysis system, a low cost reader for analyzing urine dip sticks,  and Suchek which is an indigenous, low-cost glucometer. He along with his collaborators has as many as 20 Indian and one US patents to their credit.

Education

Rohit Srivastava received his PhD degree in Biomedical Engineering from Louisiana Tech University, USA under the supervision of Michael J. McShane in 2005, MS in engineering from the same university and BE degree in Electronics Engineering from Visvesvaraya Regional College of Engineering, Nagpur in 1999. He completed his primary and secondary education from Durgapur where his father was employed in Alloy Steel Plant.

Honours and recognitions

Besides the Shanti Swarup Bhatnagar Prize for Science and Technology, Rohit Srivastava has been conferred several awards including the following:

    Himanshu Patel Chair Professor at IIT Bombay
    Indian National Academy of Engineering (INAE) – Abdul Kalam Technology Innovation National Fellowship 2019
    National Academy of Sciences, India (NASI) – Elected Fellow 2019
    Royal Society of Biology – Elected Fellow 2019
    Royal Society of Chemistry – Elected Fellow 2019
    Shri Om Prakash Bhasin Award for Excellence in Health and Medical Sciences, 2018 
    Department of Biotechnology (DBT) National Bioscience Award 2016
    Stars in Global Health, Grand Challenges Canada (GCC), Canada
    Stanford MedTech Award 2016
    DBT Biotech Product and Process Development and Commercialization Award 2015
    Vasvik Award – Award in the area of Biological Sciences and Technology 2013
    Organisation of Pharmaceutical Producers of India (OPPI) Award – Young Scientist Award 2014

References

External links

Recipients of the Shanti Swarup Bhatnagar Award in Medical Science
Louisiana Tech University alumni
Indian medical writers
Indian medical academics
Indian medical researchers
Year of birth missing (living people)
Living people